Peter Madden may refer to:
 Peter E. Madden (born 1942), American politician and businessman
 Peter Madden (actor) (1904–1976), British actor
 Peter Madden (artist), New Zealand artist, subject of a 2010 exhibition at the Institute of Modern Art in Brisbane, Australia
 Peter Madden (footballer) (born 1934), English footballer
 Peter Madden (gang leader) (fl. 1910–1914), North American gang leader
 Peter Madden (solicitor) (fl. 1979–present), solicitor in Belfast, Northern Ireland